Belkıs Zehra Kaya (born 18 March 1984) is a Turkish judoka competing in the +78 kg division.

In 2015, Kaya took the gold medal at the Grand Prix Zagreb, and two bronze medals, at the Grand Slam Baku and then at the 2015 European Games again in Baku, Azerbaijan. She won the bronze medal at the 2016 European Judo Championships in Kazan, Russia.

Achievements
.

Listed medals in international senior competitions only.

References

External links
 

1984 births
Living people
Turkish female judoka
European Games medalists in judo
European Games bronze medalists for Turkey
Judoka at the 2015 European Games
Mediterranean Games gold medalists for Turkey
Mediterranean Games bronze medalists for Turkey
Competitors at the 2005 Mediterranean Games
Competitors at the 2013 Mediterranean Games
Universiade medalists in judo
Mediterranean Games medalists in judo
Universiade silver medalists for Turkey
Universiade bronze medalists for Turkey
Medalists at the 2007 Summer Universiade
21st-century Turkish women